Hirohime (? – 575) was Empress of Japan as the consort of Emperor Bidatsu.

She was Prince Okinaga-no-Mate's daughter
First Son: 

, Saiō

Notes

Japanese empresses
575 deaths
6th-century Japanese women
Japanese princesses